The 1929 Cumaná earthquake occurred on January 17 at 07:45:44 local time, affecting Venezuela. The earthquake had an epicenter located offshore in the Caribbean Sea, and had a maximum Modified Mercalli intensity scale rating of IX (Violent). It lasted 30 seconds, causing major damage and a tsunami. More than 200 people were killed although the finalized death toll is unknown; possibly 1,600.

Earthquake
The earthquake was associated with strike-slip faulting at a shallow depth; a common characteristic for earthquakes of this depth in the region of northern Venezuela. It is one of the most extensively studied earthquakes in Venezuela prior to 1997. The El Pilar Fault System, a right-lateral strike-slip fault extending  from the Cariaco Basin to the Paria Peninsula is thought to be the source of the event. Most of the surface rupture was offshore, and only  of it was visible at the surface, extending east–west. The surface-wave magnitude was calculated to be 6.3; a revision of 6.9 which was considered an overestimation. The same fault segment is thought to have partially ruptured during the 1997 Cariaco earthquake, which occurred east of the 1929 event. It is believed that the 1929 earthquake ruptured a segment that was involved in a 1797 event.

Tsunami
At the coast of Cumaná, in Puerto De Sucre, survivors witnessed the a drawback of the sea by as much as 200 meters. The tsunami reportedly swept away some homes located along the shore, killing some 40 individuals. Cumaná suffered severe damage from the tsunami, and the waves were recorded in four other cities. Two launches, each weighing 5-tons were carried and dumped inland. Boats were destroyed.

Impact
The earthquake razed to the ground more than 3,500 homes in Cumaná. The shaking which lasted 30 seconds, severely damaged a theater, which has now been converted to a cathedral. The Church of Santa Inés suffered partial destruction of its structure, as well as to the San Antonio de la Eminencia castle. A clock tower on the Church of Santa Inés stopped working at the time the earthquake struck. After the earthquake, new towers were built around the church during restoration works. Ground collapse and landslides were reported. The earthquake was also felt in Barcelona, Margarita, Güiria, Carúpano, Río Caribe, Caracas, and Irapa. No official figure for the death toll exists, although it has been estimated to be as much as eight percent of the population of 20,000. At least 800 people were injured.

See also
List of earthquakes in 1929
List of earthquakes in Venezuela

References

1929 earthquakes
1929 tsunamis
1929 in Venezuela
Earthquakes in Venezuela
Cumaná
Floods in Venezuela
Tsunamis in Venezuela
1929 disasters in South America